Lampas elmeri is a species of showy mistletoe endemic to Borneo, in the monotypic genus Lampas. It was described by Danser in 1929.

References

Loranthaceae
Plants described in 1929
Taxa named by Benedictus Hubertus Danser